Condorcet is a lunar impact crater that is located in the eastern part of the Moon's near side, to the southeast of the Mare Crisium. It was named after French mathematician Marquis de Condorcet. To the northeast of Condorcet are the craters Hansen and Alhazen.

The outer rim of Condorcet is eroded, with a low saddle point along the northern wall and the satellite crater Condorcet Y lies across the northwestern rim. The interior floor has been resurfaced, leaving a level, nearly featureless surface that is marked only by a few tiny craterlets. The floor has a large dark patch in the western half, but the remainder is approximately the same albedo as the surrounding terrain.

Satellite craters

By convention these features are identified on lunar maps by placing the letter on the side of the crater midpoint that is closest to Condorcet.

The following craters have been renamed by the IAU.
 Condorcet K — See Wildt (crater).

References

External links

 LTO-62B2 Condorcet — L&PI topographic map
 LTO-63A4 Condorcet Se — L&PI topographic map

Impact craters on the Moon